
Gmina Kramsk is a rural gmina (administrative district) in Konin County, Greater Poland Voivodeship, in west-central Poland.

Villages
Gmina Kramsk contains the villages and settlements of Anielew, Barce, Bilczew, Borki, Brzózki, Dębicz, Drążek, Grąblin, Helenów Drugi, Helenów Pierwszy, Izabelin, Jabłków, Konstantynów, Kramsk, Kramsk-Łazy, Kramsk-Łęgi, Kramsk-Pole, Ksawerów, Lichnowo, Milin, Nowy Czarków, Osowce, Pąchów, Patrzyków, Podgór, Rudzica, Rysiny, Strumyk, Święciec, Święte, Wielany, Wola Podłężna, Wysokie and Żrekie.

Neighbouring gminas
Gmina Kramsk is bordered by the city of Konin and by the gminas of Koło, Kościelec, Krzymów, Osiek Mały, Ślesin and Sompolno.

References
Polish official population figures 2006

Kramsk
Konin County